The Birth of Love is a 1993 drama film directed by Philippe Garrel. Garrel also wrote the screenplay together with his long-time collaborators Muriel Cerf and Marc Cholodenko.

Cast
Lou Castel as Paul
Jean-Pierre Léaud as Marcus
Johanna ter Steege as Ulrika
Dominique Reymond as Hélène
Marie-Paule Laval as Fauchon
Serge Thiriet as Hélène's lover
Aurélia Alcaïs as Young woman
Max McCarthy as Pierre

External links

Films directed by Philippe Garrel
1993 films
French drama films
Films scored by John Cale
1993 drama films
1990s French films